The Austria national women's cricket team is the team that represents Austria in international women's cricket. In April 2018, the International Cricket Council (ICC) granted full Women's Twenty20 International (WT20I) status to all its members. Therefore, all Twenty20 matches played between Austria women and other ICC members since 1 July 2018 have been a full WT20I.

The team played its first WT20I matches at the 2019 France Women's T20I Quadrangular Series, in July and August 2019, in Nantes.

Squad
Austria's squad for their series against Italy in August 2022:
 Gandhali Bapat (c) (wk)
 Valentina Avdylaj
 Elvira Avdylaj
 Soujanya Bangalore Chamundaiah
 Hannah Simpson-Parker
 Saafiya Mohamed Mohideen
 Anisha Nookala
 Mahadewa Pathirannehelage
 Sriya Komati Reddy
 Priya Sabu
 Priyadharshini Ponraj
 Jo-Antoinette Stiglitz
 Büsra Uca
 Andrea-Mae Zepeda

Records and statistics
International Match Summary — Austria Women
 
Last updated 20 August 2022

Twenty20 International 

T20I record versus other nations

Records complete to WT20I #1198. Last updated 20 August 2022.

See also
 Austria national cricket team
 List of Austria women Twenty20 International cricketers

References

Women
 
Women's cricket in Austria
Women's national cricket teams